Self Goes Shopping is a remix album by alternative pop/rock band Self. The album features various previously released Self songs played electronically in often humorous styles.

The band released the songs for free via the Internet in 2000 after Gizmodgery'''s release. Original versions of "Sassy Britches" and "Crimes on Paper" can be found on The Half-Baked Serenade. "Cannon" and "So Low" both appear on Self's debut album Subliminal Plastic Motives. "Flip-Top Box" is from the Brunch EP, and "Uno Song" is on Breakfast with Girls''.

The album is still available for download at Selfies' archive.

Track listing

External links

2000 albums
Self (band) albums
Albums free for download by copyright owner